Amatul Kibria Keya Chowdhury is a Bangladesh Awami League politician and Member of Parliament.

Biography
Amatul Kibria Keya Chowdhury's father was  Commandant Manik Chowdhury, a Bangladesh Awami League politician and an accused in the Agartala Conspiracy Case. He fought for the Independence of Bangladesh from Pakistan in 1971. Amatul's father died when she was eight years old. She is the secretary general of Chetona '71 in Habiganj District, a non-government organisation that documents the history of Bangladesh Liberation war. She was elected to parliament from the 28 number seat, based in Habiganj District, of the reserved seats for women in 2014. She has campaigned for the recognition of female "freedom fighters" by the government of Bangladesh and providing them with the facilities due under law. She was able to successfully get recognition for six female "freedom fighters".

Amatul Kibria Keya Chowdhury was hospitalized on 10 November 2017 after attending a program of Department of Social Services in Bahubal Upazila, Habiganj District, during which a physical altercation broke out between her supporters and those of Bahubal Upazila Vice-chairman and Jubo League leader, Tara Mia. The program was to distribute welfare cheques and benefits cards among elderly gypsies. The Police had to charge at the crowd to bring the situation under control.

References

Awami League politicians
Living people
Women members of the Jatiya Sangsad
Year of birth missing (living people)
10th Jatiya Sangsad members
People from Bahubal Upazila
21st-century Bangladeshi women politicians